"Who Booty" is a song by American R&B singer Jonn Hart, featuring vocals from rapper Iamsu!, originally from his debut mixtape Heart 2 Hart. The song has been in regular rotation on radio stations, peaking at #3 on the Rhythmic Songs chart, and #31 on the Billboard Top 40 Pop Songs chart.

Remix 

A remix version of the song featuring a verse from rapper French Montana extended the song's life on the airwaves. The song was released by Epic Records and was near the top 30 of Billboard Hot R&B/Hip-Hop Songs chart. It peaked at #66 on the Billboard Hot 100 and #20 on the Hot R&B/Hip-Hop Songs chart.

Another remix was released, called the R&Bay Remix, featuring new verses from Jonn Hart and a guest verse from E-40.

Charts

Year-end charts

References 

2012 singles
2012 songs
Iamsu! songs
French Montana songs
Epic Records singles
American hip hop songs
American contemporary R&B songs